Miller Freeman, Inc., was a San Francisco-based publisher of trade books and business magazines, as well as a manager of trade and industry expositions.  It was an innovative force in business technology and communications in the 1990s until its breakup in 2000. A substantial part of the company was owned by UBM which is now owned by Informa.

History
The company was founded in 1902 by Miller Freeman, a fishing industry magnate, Republican party activist, and the founder and leader of Washington State's Anti-Japanese League. Many of its publications were trade and marketing periodicals distributed free to qualified subscribers in specific industries. 

Miller Freeman was acquired by United Newspapers in January 1985, but continued to be run by Marshall Freeman, the founder's grandson, until 2000. In 1991, Miller Freeman Publications merged with Gralla Publications to create Miller Freeman, Inc. Gralla's operations comprised twenty magazines and many trade shows serving markets in the travel, retail, and merchandising arenas. In 1992, Miller Freeman acquired M&T Publishing, Inc. and its four magazines in the software development and networking markets.

During the Internet economic boom of the middle and late 1990s, the company moved aggressively to acquire many technology publications centered on the Internet and telecommunications industries, including the Blenheim Group, producers of the PC EXPO trade show (1996). The company was also notable for publishing Game Developer.  In 1999 United News and Media spent $900 million to acquire CMP Media, a leading publisher of high-tech magazines, to complement its Miller Freeman holdings.

Subsequent to the acquisition of CMP Media, Miller Freeman later sold CMP UK and France (including rights to CRN in those countries) to VNU, a media holding company based in the Netherlands (now part of Incisive Media).

Some of Miller Freeman, including the book division, was merged into their CMP equivalents, retaining the CMP rather than the Miller Freeman name. The music book division was renamed Backbeat Books which later sold to Hal Leonard. (music magazine division was renamed Music Player Network which later divested with the rest of CMP Entertainment Media to NewBay Media and today is a part of Future US).

In 2000, as part of United News and Media's divestiture of assets, the part of Miller Freeman Inc. which had not been merged into CMP was acquired by VNU for a reported price of $650 million ($695M Euros). The slightly smaller European portion of Miller Freeman was sold to Reed Elsevier with a few other smaller sales. At the time of divestiture, Miller Freeman assets included 81 magazines, 59 trade shows and related conferences and exhibitions, and various Web sites in five major categories: real estate and construction, sports & apparel, jewelry and gifts, travel and Latin America. Subsequent to divestiture the remaining United News and Media was renamed United Business Media, which retained Miller Freeman's United Kingdom and Asia divisions.

VNU merged much of the purchased Miller Freeman assets into VNU Expositions but VNU subsequently divested themselves of a few former Miller Freeman assets.

Miller Freeman, Inc. trademark was formerly owned by UBM, a subsidiary of Informa, but the trademark was abandoned in 2001.

Impact
Miller Freeman was an innovator in Internet business media and business technology tradeshows. Alan Peterson, former Director of Miller Freeman's electronic EOEM division, is quoted as saying, "The value-driven culture at Miller Freeman had a profound impression on me. The entrepreneurship that took place at headquarters during the Internet boom was nothing less than electrifying. I had what I would call unbridled opportunism there. That means going into markets, not being constrained and jumping on opportunities."

See also

 CyberArts International

Footnotes

Further reading

 Staff (28 November 2005) "The immortal Miller Freeman: industry legend" Tradeshow Week 35(47): pp. 42–45;

External links

 "About Miller Freeman, Inc." from Miller Freeman's 1999 webpage via Web archive;
press release VNU enters into an agreement to acquire Miller Freeman, Inc.
United Business Media corporate website.

Magazine publishing companies of the United States
Defunct book publishing companies of the United States
Communications and media organizations based in the United States
Publishing companies established in 1902
Book publishing companies based in San Francisco
Publishing companies of the United States
Publishing companies disestablished in 2000